Vladislav Anatolyevich Velikodny (born 6 April 1971; some sources incorrectly list his first name as Vadim or Vladimir) is a former Russian football player.

References

1971 births
Living people
Soviet footballers
FC Spartak-UGP Anapa players
Russian footballers
FC Kuban Krasnodar players
Russian Premier League players
Association football midfielders
FC Lokomotiv Moscow players